José Antonio "Toñín"  Casillas Fernández (born 8 August 1935) in Humacao, Puerto Rico is a Puerto Rican former basketball player who competed in the 1960 Summer Olympics.

References

1935 births
Living people
People from Humacao, Puerto Rico
Puerto Rican men's basketball players
Puerto Rican expatriate sportspeople in Spain
Olympic basketball players of Puerto Rico
Basketball players at the 1960 Summer Olympics
Basketball players at the 1959 Pan American Games
Pan American Games medalists in basketball
Pan American Games silver medalists for Puerto Rico
Medalists at the 1959 Pan American Games